Lauralee is a given name. Notable people with the name include:

 Lauralee Bell (born 1968), American soap opera actress
 Lauralee Martin (born 1951), American businesswoman
 Lauralee Martinovich, 1997 New Zealand Miss World contestant

See also
 Laura Lee
 Laura (given name)

Feminine given names